Steve Fanara (born August 30, 1966) is an American football coach.  He served as the head football coach at Howard Payne University in Brownwood, Texas for four seasons, from 2008 to 2011.  Before being named to the post, he was the defensive coordinator at Howard Payne under the previous head coach, Mike Redwine.

Personal life
Fanara earned his bachelor's degree at Southwest Baptist University in Bolivar, Missouri, where he played football for two seasons before beginning his coaching career as a student assistant.  Fanara also holds a master's degree from MidAmerica Nazarene University.

Head coaching record

College

References

1966 births
Living people
American football quarterbacks
Howard Payne Yellow Jackets football coaches
MidAmerica Nazarene Pioneers football coaches
Olivet Nazarene Tigers football coaches
Southeastern Oklahoma State Savage Storm football coaches
Southwest Baptist Bearcats football coaches
Southwest Baptist Bearcats football players
High school football coaches in Missouri
High school football coaches in New Jersey
High school football coaches in Texas
MidAmerica Nazarene University alumni
People from Blue Springs, Missouri
Players of American football from Missouri